Puketotara is a statistical area in the Far North District of New Zealand. It covers 55 square kilometres around Puketotara Stream. There are no population centres in the area, with Waipapa being to the northeast, Kerikeri to the east, Waimate North to the south, and Ōkaihau to the southwest. Kerikeri Airport is within the area, and State Highway 10 runs mostly north–south through it. Rainbow Falls (Waianiwaniwa) is on the eastern boundary.

Demographics

Puketotara had a population of 1,677 at the 2018 New Zealand census, an increase of 297 people (21.5%) since the 2013 census, and an increase of 384 people (29.7%) since the 2006 census. There were 600 households, comprising 846 males and 831 females, giving a sex ratio of 1.02 males per female. The median age was 45.6 years (compared with 37.4 years nationally), with 333 people (19.9%) aged under 15 years, 225 (13.4%) aged 15 to 29, 825 (49.2%) aged 30 to 64, and 294 (17.5%) aged 65 or older.

Ethnicities were 89.6% European/Pākehā, 16.5% Māori, 2.7% Pacific peoples, 2.5% Asian, and 2.5% other ethnicities. People may identify with more than one ethnicity.

The percentage of people born overseas was 25.0, compared with 27.1% nationally.

Although some people chose not to answer the census's question about religious affiliation, 54.6% had no religion, 30.9% were Christian, 1.1% had Māori religious beliefs, 0.4% were Hindu, 0.2% were Muslim, 1.1% were Buddhist and 2.0% had other religions.

Of those at least 15 years old, 237 (17.6%) people had a bachelor's or higher degree, and 213 (15.8%) people had no formal qualifications. The median income was $32,200, compared with $31,800 nationally. 213 people (15.8%) earned over $70,000 compared to 17.2% nationally. The employment status of those at least 15 was that 675 (50.2%) people were employed full-time, 249 (18.5%) were part-time, and 48 (3.6%) were unemployed.

References

Far North District
Populated places in the Northland Region